Miriam Herbie Nakamoto (born August 5, 1976) is an American professional female Muay Thai fighter and mixed martial artist fighting at Bantamweight (135 pounds).

Early life
Nakamoto was born in the U.S. state of Hawaii and began training in Muay Thai at 23 years old. She later moved to California to live with her father and a stepmother. Nakamoto's great grandmother arrived in Hawaii as a picture bride.

Muay Thai career
Nakamoto began fighting Muay Thai professionally in 2005. She is an eight-time world champion in the sport. Having produced a perfect 16–0 record to date.

Mixed martial arts career

Red Canvas
In 2012, Nakamoto made the transition to MMA. On September 15, 2012, Nakamoto made her MMA debut at Red Canvas Fight Promotions- Art of Submission 2. Nakamoto finished her opponent, Elizabeth Phillips, with knees in the 2nd round.

Invicta Fighting Championships
Nakamoto made her Invicta FC debut on April 5, 2013, at Invicta FC 5: Penne vs. Waterson. Nakamoto knocked out future The Ultimate Fighter 18 contestant Jessamyn “The Gun” Duke in the first round. Nakamoto was awarded the IFC: Knock out of the Night. Even though the result was originally a KO victory for Nakamoto, over a month later, it was overturned by the Missouri Office of Athletics to no contest due to an illegal knee.

Nakamoto returned to Invicta FC for their next event, Invicta FC 6: Coenen vs. Cyborg. Miriam faced professional boxer Duda Yankovich. Nakamoto won by first round technical-knockout due to knee and punches. Again, Nakamoto was awarded the IFC: Knock out of the Night.

Nakamoto faced undefeated Lauren Murphy for the inaugural Invicta FC bantamweight championship belt at Invicta FC 7: Honchak vs. Smith on December 7, 2013. Nakamoto lost the fight in the fourth round when she injured her knee.

On July 28, 2019, Nakamoto announced that Joe Rogan has paid for her to have stem-cell therapy to treat her meniscus which has a grade 3 lesion and prevented her from fighting since 2013.

Television and film
In 2005, Nakamoto was the Female Lead in the music video Tired of Being Sorry directed by Joaquin Phoenix and performed by indie rock band Ringside. In 2007, Miriam was on the hit reality TV show, Fight Girls, which aired on the Oxygen Channel. In episode 5, Nakamoto defeated housemate Jennifer Tate by split decision after three exhibition rounds.

Championships and accomplishments

Mixed martial arts
Invicta Fighting Championships
Knockout of the Night (Two times)

Muay Thai
World Championship Kickboxing
2012 WCK Champion of Champions Super Lightweight Champion
World Boxing Council Muaythai
2010 WBC Muaythai World Lightweight Champion (Two title defenses)
World Muaythai Council
2010 WMC World Lightweight Champion
Thai Boxing Association
2010 TBA World Lightweight Champion
World Professional Muaythai Federation
2007 WPMF Light Welterweight Champion
International Federation of Muaythai Amateur
2009 IFMA Muaythai World Championships Gold Medalist Light Welterweight
2009 IFMA Muaythai World Championships Best Female Boxer

Amateur boxing
San Francisco Golden Gloves
2004 Champion

Kickboxing record (incomplete)

|-
|-  bgcolor="#CCFFCC"
| 2013-08-24 || Win ||align=left| Aleide Lawant || WCK Muay Thai Hot Summer Fights || Temecula, California, USA || Decision (unanimous) || 5 || 2:00 || 14–0
|-
|-
! style=background:white colspan=9 |
|-
|-  bgcolor="#CCFFCC"
| 2012-08-18 || Win ||align=left| Julie Kitchen || WCK Muay Thai Champion of Champions || Pala, California, USA || Decision (unanimous) || 5 || 2:00 || 13–0
|-
|-
! style=background:white colspan=9 |
|-
|-
|-  bgcolor="#CCFFCC"
| 2012-04-28 || Win ||align=left| Sandra Bastian || Legends Muay Thai Championships || San Francisco, California, USA || TKO (strikes) || 3 || N/A || 12–0
|-
|-
! style=background:white colspan=9 |
|-
|-  bgcolor="#CCFFCC"
| 2010-12-19 || Win ||align=left| Chantal Ughi || WCK Muay Thai || Haikou, China || Decision (unanimous)|| 5 || 2:00 || 11–0
|-
|-  bgcolor="#CCFFCC"
| 2010-12-11 || Win ||align=left| Claire Haigh || WCK Muay Thai The Top Best || Haikou, China || TKO (strikes) || 1 || N/A || 10–0
|-
|-
! style=background:white colspan=9 |
|-
|-
|-  bgcolor="#CCFFCC"
| 2010-05-01 || Win ||align=left| Gao Xing || Wu Lin Fen || China || Decision (unanimous) || 5 || 2:00 || 9–0
|-
|-  bgcolor="#CCFFCC"
| 2010-04-03 || Win ||align=left| Angela Rivera-Parr || Muay Thai in America || Santa Monica, California, USA || Decision (unanimous) || 5 || 3:00 || 8–0
|-
|-
! style=background:white colspan=9 |
|-
|-  bgcolor="#CCFFCC"
| 2008-05-31 || Win ||align=left| Sally Krumdiak || XFA 2 || Las Vegas, Nevada, USA || Decision (unanimous) || 3 || 3:00 || 7–0
|-
|-  bgcolor="#CCFFCC"
| 2007-08-12 || Win ||align=left| Helena || Queen's Cup || Bangkok, Thailand || Decision (unanimous) || 5 || 2:00 || 6–0
|-
|-
! style=background:white colspan=9 |
|-
|-  bgcolor="#CCFFCC"
| 2006-03-00 || Win ||align=left| || FIght Girls Finals || Phuket, Thailand || Decision (split) || 5 || 2:00 || 5–0
|-
|-
|-  bgcolor="#CCFFCC"
| 2006-00-00 || Win ||align=left| Jennifer Tate || Fight Girls || Las Vegas, Nevada, USA || Decision (split) || 3 || 2:00 || 4–0
|-

|-
|-  bgcolor="#CCFFCC"
| 2009-12-03 || Win ||align=left| Rachida Hilali || IFMA World Muaythai Championships 2009, Finals || Bangkok, Thailand || Decision (unanimous) || N/A || N/A || 
|-
|-
! style=background:white colspan=9 |
|-
|-  bgcolor="#CCFFCC"
| 2009-12-02 || Win ||align=left| Jenni Andersson || IFMA World Muaythai Championships 2009, Semi Finals || Bangkok, Thailand || N/A || N/A || N/A || 
|-
|-  bgcolor="#CCFFCC"
| 2009-11-30 || Win ||align=left| Katariina Perkkio || IFMA World Muaythai Championships 2009, Quarter Finals || Bangkok, Thailand || N/A || N/A || N/A || 
|-
|-
| colspan=9 | Legend:

Mixed martial arts record

|-
| Loss
| style="text-align:center;"|2–1 (1)
| Lauren Murphy
| TKO (injury)
| Invicta FC 7: Honchak vs. Smith
| 
| style="text-align:center;"| 4
| style="text-align:center;"| 0:23
| Kansas City, Missouri, United States
| 
|-
| Win
| style="text-align:center;"|2–0 (1)
| Duda Yankovich
| TKO (knee and punches)
| Invicta FC 6: Coenen vs. Cyborg
| 
| style="text-align:center;"| 1
| style="text-align:center;"| 2:08
| Kansas City, Missouri, United States
| 
|-
| NC
| style="text-align:center;"| 1–0 (1)
| Jessamyn Duke
| NC (overturned)
| Invicta FC 5: Penne vs. Waterson
| 
| style="text-align:center;"| 1
| style="text-align:center;"| 2:20
| Kansas City, Missouri, United States
| 
|-
| Win
| style="text-align:center;"| 1–0
| Elizabeth Phillips
| TKO (knees)
| Red Canvas - Art of Submission 2
| 
| style="text-align:center;"| 2
| style="text-align:center;"| 3:39
| San Jose, California, United States
|
|-

Professional boxing record

See also
List of female mixed martial artists
List of female kickboxers

References

External links
Miriam Nakamoto at Awakening Fighters

1976 births
Living people
American female mixed martial artists
American Muay Thai practitioners
Female Muay Thai practitioners
American female kickboxers
American practitioners of Brazilian jiu-jitsu
Female Brazilian jiu-jitsu practitioners
Bantamweight mixed martial artists
Mixed martial artists utilizing Muay Thai
Mixed martial artists utilizing boxing
Mixed martial artists utilizing Brazilian jiu-jitsu
American sportspeople of Japanese descent
American women boxers
People from Dublin, California
21st-century American women
Kickboxers from Hawaii
Mixed martial artists from Hawaii